Dive! Dive! Live! is the first live video recorded by heavy metal singer Bruce Dickinson. It was filmed at Wolf & Rissmiller's Country Club on Sherman Way, Reseda, California, on 14 August 1990, while finishing the Tattooed Millionaire US tour leg. The video was produced by Paul Flattery and directed by Jim Yukich—who also worked on Iron Maiden's Live After Death—and the backing band was the same as on "Tattooed Millionaire", save drummer Dickie Fliszar, who replaced Fabio del Rio to perform during the tour. The set-list consisted practically of all the songs from the Tattooed Millionaire sessions, except for "Darkness Be My Friend" from "All The Young Dudes" single. It included "Bring Your Daughter... to the Slaughter" and some cover versions played throughout the tour, like Deep Purple's "Black Night", AC/DC's "Sin City". "Riding with the Angels" is a song composed while Dickinson still played with Samson.

On an interview in the Anthology DVD release, Bruce revealed that he was not happy with the production of Dive! Dive! Live!  A camera-rig rail needed to be laid half-way through the crowd in order to film the performance on stage. Dickinson was also displeased by a lack of a warm-up act, the fact that a make up artist was hired and that the crowd was not allowed to be served beer. Dickinson was so displeased with the end-product that he tossed the film in a ditch after the show, though it was salvaged and undamaged.

Track listing 
All songs written by Bruce Dickinson and Janick Gers, except where noted.

 "Riding with the Angels" (Russ Ballard)
 "Born in '58"
 "Lickin' the Gun"
 "Gypsy Road"
 "Dive! Dive! Dive!"
 "Zulu Lulu/Ballad of Mutt"
 "Son of a Gun"
 "Hell on Wheels"
 "All the Young Dudes" (David Bowie)
 "Tattooed Millionaire"
 "No Lies"
 "Fog on the Tyne/Winds of Change" 
 "Sin City" (Bon Scott, Angus Young, Malcolm Young)
 "Bring Your Daughter... to the Slaughter" (Dickinson)
 "Black Night" (Ritchie Blackmore, Ian Gillan, Roger Glover, Jon Lord, Ian Paice)

Personnel

Band
 Bruce Dickinson – vocals, tambourines, drums
 Janick Gers – guitars
 Andy Carr – bass, backing vocals
 Dickie Fliszar – drums, backing vocals

Production
Jim Yukich - director
Paul Flattery - producer
Doug Hall - live sound
Chris Tsangarides - mixing

References

External links
Bruce Dickinson's official website

Bruce Dickinson video albums
1991 live albums
1991 video albums
Live video albums